DMEA may refer to:

 Dimethylethanolamine
 N,N-Dimethylethylamine